The Boyce-Gregg House is a historic house in Memphis, Tennessee, U.S..

History
The house was built for C. R. Boyce, a cotton broker, in 1920. He died in 1930, and the house remained in the Boyce family until 1936.

The house was purchased by Russell C. Gregg, the Memphis manager of the Anderson, Clayton and Company, a cotton brokering firm. One of his daughters married Henry Loeb, the mayor of Memphis. In 1973, the house was purchased by his son-in-law, C. Wrede Petersmeyer.

The house served as a residence until 1979 when it was renovated by a local architectural firm for offices on the second floor for Day Companies, Inc. The house was bought by the Junior League of Memphis in 1991. The house, now called the Community Resource Center by the Junior League members, is used as a meeting space and wedding venue. The first floor remains almost completely the same as it did in 1920, besides renovation of the kitchen and the addition of a bathroom.

Architectural significance
The house was designed by Jones & Furbringer. It has been listed on the National Register of Historic Places since December 19, 1979.

References

Houses on the National Register of Historic Places in Tennessee
Houses completed in 1920
Houses in Memphis, Tennessee
1920 establishments in Tennessee